Sunshine is a census-designated place in Luna County, New Mexico, United States. Its population was 420 as of the 2010 census. New Mexico State Road 11 passes through the community.

Geography

Demographics

Education
Like other areas in Luna County, the community is in the Deming Public Schools school district.

References

Census-designated places in New Mexico
Census-designated places in Luna County, New Mexico